Dimbavalli is a village in Dharwad district of Karnataka, India.

Demographics 
As of the 2011 Census of India there were 69 households in Dimbavalli and a total population of 426 consisting of 204 males and 222 females. There were 79 children ages 0-6.

References

Villages in Dharwad district